Huabal District is one of twelve districts of the province Jaén in Peru's Cajamarca region.

References